This is a following list of the MTV Movie Award winners and nominees for Best Villain. In 2012, the award was renamed Best On-Screen Dirt Bag, though the Best Villain moniker was reinstated the following year. Two of the winners (Denzel Washington and Heath Ledger) also won Academy Awards for their performances. In 1999, Best Villain had a tie for Matt Dillon and Stephen Dorff. Daniel Radcliffe is the first recipient to win both this and Best Hero. Ewan McGregor and Dwayne Johnson have received nominations in both categories, but never won in either.

Winners and nominees

References

MTV Movie & TV Awards